"Mecha Love" is the first single by British grime band Hadouken! from their third studio album Every Weekend. It was released on 18 October 2010.

Background
The band had confirmed several times earlier that they had started work on their third album and that they were demoing tracks. They later stated they had recorded two songs to be released as singles (Mecha Love and Oxygen) before they headed to the studio to record the rest of the album.

The song made its radio debut on Radio 1, where it was played by Nick Grimshaw after a chat with James Smith. He then posted the link to the music video on his Facebook page.

Music video
The video for Mecha Love was published to YouTube through Hadouken!'s channel on 5 October 2010. It is a 3D anime music video that features various explosive battles between mecha in a futuristic city. The battles grow more violent, and the city is reduced to ruins as a result of the combat. The video itself is a compilation of scenes from the 2004 anime film Appleseed.

Also released was a video named 'PEOPLE ARE AWESOME' which consisted of a compilation of 'awesome people doing incredible things'. The video was accompanied by the song and has received over 81 million views.

Track listing
"Mecha Love" (Radio Edit) – 3:08
"Mecha Love" (Album Version) – 4:48

Chart Positions

References

Hadouken! songs
2010 singles
2010 songs
EMI Records singles